Selective TV, Inc. is an American terrestrial broadcasting company in Alexandria, Minnesota. As a non-profit UHF translator it is funded by the voluntary contributions of its viewers in several counties of West Central Minnesota.
Most of Selective TV's transmitters are licensed as low-power television stations; Channels 18, 27, 36, and 47 are licensed as translators, and all are digital transmitters.

Broadcast Translators

Broadcast

Until December 2017, WCCO-TV, Minneapolis's CBS owned-and-operated station, was omitted from Selective TV's lineup, as WCCO operated its own satellite station in Alexandria, KCCO-TV (channel 7), which shut down at the end of 2017. On December 22, 2017, Selective TV announced that it struck a deal to add WCCO to its lineup.

Additional channels
Selective TV's additional offerings include:

K44GH-D is included on Selective TV's lineup but is not owned by Selective TV. The station is owned by Edge Spectrum and is controlled by Three Angels Broadcasting Network, which occupies all of the station's subchannels.

References

Official Channel Lineup
List of licensees and incomplete network affiliations of all stations in Minnesota
Source for some of the missing channels
Selective TV lineup

External links
Official Website

Television broadcasting companies of the United States